The Blue Knights Drum and Bugle Corps  is a World Class competitive junior drum and bugle corps. Based in Denver, Colorado, the Blue Knights are a member corps of Drum Corps International (DCI).

History
Fred and Fae Taylor were a pair of former vaudeville comedians and musicians who had settled in Denver and operated the Fred and Fae Talent School, where they taught vocal and instrumental music to young people. Fred was an accomplished drummer and a member of the Denver American Legion Grenadiers Senior Drum and Bugle Corps, and he believed that a junior  corps would provide an opportunity for their music students to perform before the public.

Although the intent was for the corps to be a parade corps, it entered its first field competition during its first season, and in 1959, the corps traveled to the VFW National Championships in Minneapolis. In 1963, the corps joined the Great Plains Drum and Bugle Corps Association and entered into a period extending through the sixties and seventies where they were regularly competing in Kansas, Oklahoma, Colorado, Wyoming and Nebraska. 

The corps attended its first DCI Championships in 1975 in Philadelphia, finishing 11th in the Class A preliminaries. In 1977, 1978, and 2004 the Blue Knights were hosts for the Drum Corps International World Championships. In 1979, the corps renamed its home competition, Drums Along The Rockies and turned it into both a major national competition and one of the corps' primary fundraising activities.

In 1984, George and Lynn Lindstrom became the corps directors. The Lindstroms were to instill the corps with a professional attitude toward competition; the successful bingo operation, in place since the early 80s, made it possible for the corps to purchase the equipment necessary to fulfill the goals of the new attitude. The Lindstroms departed after the 1985 season, and director Mark Arnold was hired. Under Arnold's leadership, the corps became a major competitor, earning its first finals spot in 1991. Since then, the corps been a finalist twenty-four times across twenty-eight seasons.

In 2021, after working as acting director during the 2021 season, Daniel Belcher was promoted to executive director.

Blue Knights Percussion Ensemble 
The Blue Knights Percussion Ensemble was established in 1993 and first competed in the 1994 Winter Guard International season where they won their first world championship. They also won world championships in 1999, 2000, and 2003. The Blue Knights are also the longest continually running WGI Percussion Ensemble.

The Blue Knights also operated an open class ensemble that made appearances at WGI Percussion Independent Open finals in 2005 and 2006.

Show summary (1975–2022)
Source:

References

External links
Official website

Drum Corps International World Class corps
Musical groups from Denver
Musical groups established in 1958
1958 establishments in Colorado